Shabestar (also known as Chabiastar, Shabiastar, and Shabistar) is a city in the Central District of Shabestar County, East Azerbaijan province, Iran, and serves as capital of the county. At the 2006 census, its population was 13,857 in 3,989 households. The following census in 2011 counted 15,663 people in 4,824 households. The latest census in 2016 showed a population of 22,181 people in 7,004 households. The population is Azerbaijanis.

Shabestar is located in proximity to Tabriz, the provincial capital, on the main Iranian-International railway line which connects Tehran and Tabriz to Turkey and Europe. During the Safavid period. Shabestar's economy and development has received a major boost due to the 'Azad' university  built there.

Historical monuments 
Mosque of Tasouj 
Mojoumbar Church
Sohrol Church
Mosque Sheykh Esmayil Shabestari
Great Jameh Mosque
Khalil Shrine and Rudqat Bridge are the historic and ancient monuments of Shabestar.

References 

Shabestar County

Cities in East Azerbaijan Province

Populated places in East Azerbaijan Province

Populated places in Shabestar County